Commando Drift Nature Reserve is a nature reserve in Eastern Cape Province, South Africa that is managed by Eastern Cape Parks, the park has an area of . The Kommandodrif Dam is included in the reserve.

Endangered mountain zebras, black wildebeest, some species of antelope as well as over 200 species of birds can be found in the park.

See also

References

External links
 Eastern Cape Parks

Eastern Cape Provincial Parks
Protected areas of the Eastern Cape